Ouled Si Slimane District is a district of Batna Province, Algeria.

Municipalities
Ouled Si Slimane
Lemsane
Taxlent

Districts of Batna Province